De Teresa is a Spanish surname. Notable people with the surname include:
Ana de Teresa (born 2001), Spanish footballer
Jose de Teresa (1850–1902), Mexican businessman and politician
Luz de Teresa (born 1965), Mexican and Spanish mathematician
Tomás de Teresa (born 1968), Spanish middle distance runner

See also
Guillermo Ruiz de Teresa (born 1953), Mexican politician
Guillermo Tovar y de Teresa (1956–2013), Mexican historian and art collector)
Rafael Tovar y de Teresa (1954–2016), Mexican diplomat

Spanish-language surnames